Theatricals is a book of two plays by Henry James published in 1894. The plays, Tenants and Disengaged, had failed to be produced, so James put them out in book form with a rueful preface about his inability to get the plays onto the stage.

Plot summaries

Based on a short story Flavien: Scènes de la vie contemporaine by Henri Rivière, Tenants tells of a widowed Englishman, Sir Frederick Byng, his son Norman, and his ward Mildred Stanmore. Norman and Mildred are in love, but Sir Frederick disapproves and forces his son to take a post in India. Meanwhile, Sir Frederick's former mistress, the long-widowed Eleanor Vibert, rents his lodge at Clere, near the family house. Eleanor brings along her son Claude, who (unknown to himself) is the illegitimate child of Sir Frederick.

After many complications including some minor fisticuffs, Mildred and the returned Norman will marry, Claude learns the truth about his parentage and forgives his mother, and Eleanor refuses Sir Frederick's offer of marriage. Mildred embraces Eleanor to close the play on a bittersweet note.

The other play published in this book, Disengaged, was based on James' own story, The Solution. At Brisket Place, forty miles outside London, a naive army captain, Llewellyn Prime, is made to believe that he has compromised Blandina Wigmore and must propose to her. He does so and is accepted.

Many entrances and exits and much other stage business follow. Eventually, the youthful widow Mrs. Jasper gets Prime out of his engagement to Blandina and then accepts his marriage proposal. She was one of the plotters who had got him to propose to Blandina in the first place, but she quickly repented of her folly. Meanwhile, Blandina accepts Percy Trafford, who was also one of those who got Prime into the original mess, but regretted it soon afterwards.

Key themes
The best part of the book may be James' brief but witty introduction, where he tells of his failure to get these two plays onto the stage. He barely consoles himself with the publication of the plays in book form: "The covers of the book may, in a seat that costs nothing, figure the friendly curtain, and the legible lines the various voices of the stage; so that if these things manage at all to disclose a picture or to drop a tone into the reader's ear the ghostly ordeal will in a manner have been passed and the dim footlights faced."

Compared to this discussion the plays themselves seem artificial and way too busy. Tenants is probably the better of the two thanks to Eleanor Vibert, who faces the secrets of her past and overcomes them. The incessant comings and goings of Disengaged mostly dissipate any interest the play might have generated. Based on the hopelessly outmoded idea of a "compromised" woman and far too encumbered with frenetic stage business, Disengaged collapses under James' misguided efforts to keep things lively. Ironically, the play did get a couple performances in New York in 1902 and 1909. It received scathing reviews as "nerveless, heartless, soulless" and "fantastic nonsense."

Critical evaluation
It would be an Everest-sized understatement to say that James' plays have gotten bad notices from critics. Some have gone so far as to recommend would-be readers of James to skip the plays altogether, or at most to approach them gingerly after reading just about everything else he wrote.

Deprived of the interior monologue and intense analysis of consciousness that James made such a large part of his fiction, the plays in this book do seem superficial and unconvincing compared to his narratives. Although James fell under the spell of the theater from an early age, he never mastered the art of presenting vibrant characters and significant drama in dialogue-only form.

References
 The Complete Plays of Henry James edited by Leon Edel (New York: Oxford University Press 1990) 

Plays by Henry James
1894 plays